Times Square is an album by vibraphonist Gary Burton. It features trumpeter Tiger Okoshi, bassist Steve Swallow and drummer Roy Haynes.

Track listing 
"Semblance" (Keith Jarrett) – 4:01
"Coral" (Jarrett) – 5:48
"Careful" (Jim Hall) – 4:42
"Peau Douce" (Steve Swallow) – 4:55
"Midnight" (Swallow) – 4:21
"Radio" (Swallow) – 4:42
"True Or False" (Swallow, Roy Haynes) – 2:21
"Como En Vietnam" (Swallow) – 6:43

This is the official track list, but in reality pieces 3 and 4 are titled inverted. "Peau Douce" by Steve Swallow is the third track and "Careful" by Jim Hall is the fourth track.

Personnel 
 Gary Burton – vibraphone
 Steve Swallow – bass guitar
 Roy Haynes – drums
 Tiger Okoshi – trumpet

References 

1978 albums
Gary Burton albums
ECM Records albums
Albums produced by Manfred Eicher